Žibininkai is a village in Lithuania. It is located in the Kretinga municipality, 4 km northeast of the Baltic Sea resort Palanga.

In the village there is a spacious complex of the brewery "HBH Juozo alus", where visitors can find beer gardens, restaurants, a horse riding centre and a vast playground. According to the 2011 census, the village had 44 residents.

External links

Internet pages of the brewery complex (in Lithuanian, English, German, Latvian and Russian)

References

Villages in Klaipėda County